Ginamaría Hidalgo (August 23, 1927 – February 10, 2004) was a light-lyric soprano Argentine singer.

1927 births
2004 deaths
20th-century Argentine women singers